This is a list of territorial changes to the district of Helmstedt, Lower Saxony, Germany during the administrative reforms of the 1970s.

 Municipalities lost:
 to Gifhorn
Ahnebeck
Bergfeld
Brechtorf
Eischott
Hoitlingen
Parsau
Rühen
Tiddische
 to Wolfsburg
Brackstedt
Kastorf
Neuhaus
Nordsteimke
Reislingen
Velstove
Vorsfelde
Warmenau
Wendschott
 Municipalities gained:
 from Gifhorn 
Ahmstorf
Beienrode
Essenrode
Klein Steimke
Ochsendorf
Rennau
Rottorf am Klei
Uhry
 from Brunswick 
Beienrode
Essehof
Flechtorf
Groß Brunsrode
Klein Brunsrode
Lehre
Wendhausen

Helmstedt
Helmstedt
Helmstedt